Heery may refer to:
 Heery International, an Atlanta-based architectural firm
 George T. Heery, its founder
 Eamon Heery, former Gaelic football player